John Washington Butler (December 17, 1875 – September 24, 1952) was an American farmer and a member of the Tennessee House of Representatives from 1923-1927, representing Macon, Trousdale, and Sumner counties. He is most noted for introducing the Butler Act, which prohibited teaching of evolution in public (i.e. state) schools (and which was challenged in the Scopes Trial).  He was an admirer of William Jennings Bryan.

According to Butler,

See also

Creation and evolution in public education

References

External links

Baptists from Tennessee
Democratic Party members of the Tennessee House of Representatives
1875 births
1952 deaths
American Christian creationists
Farmers from Tennessee
People from Macon County, Tennessee